Tongyushi was a legendary Chinese empress, the third wife of the Yellow Emperor. According to tradition, she invented the cooking and chopsticks in the 27th century BC.

References

Legendary Chinese people
Chinese empresses